The name Țepeș may refer to:

People
 Andrei Țepeș (born 1991), Romanian footballer
 Vlad III the Impaler ( Vlad Țepeș; 1431–1476), Romanian nobleman
 Vlad Țepeș (disambiguation)

Places
 Țepeș Vodă (disambiguation), several villages in Romania
 Vlad Ţepes, one of five villages comprising Comana, Giurgiu, Romania

See also
 Tepe (disambiguation)
 Tepeš (surname)